Calliotropis calatha is a species of sea snail, a marine gastropod mollusk in the family Eucyclidae.

Description
The shell grows to a length of 10 mm

Distribution
This species occurs in the Atlantic Ocean from Georgia to Florida, in the Caribbean Sea, the Gulf of Mexico and the Lesser Antilles

References

 Dall W. H. (1927). Small shells from dredgings off the southeast coast of the United states by the United States Fisheries Steamer "Albatross", in 1885 and 1886, Proceedings of the United States National Museum, 70(18): 1–134
 Rosenberg, G., F. Moretzsohn, and E. F. García. 2009. Gastropoda (Mollusca) of the Gulf of Mexico, pp. 579–699 in Felder, D.L. and D.K. Camp (eds.), Gulf of Mexico–Origins, Waters, and Biota. Biodiversity. Texas A&M Press, College Station, Texas

External links

calatha
Gastropods described in 1927